Ryding is a surname. Notable people with the surname include:

 Axel Ryding (1831–1897), Swedish Army lieutenant general
 Dave Ryding (born 1986), British alpine skier
 Edvin Ryding (born 2003), Swedish actor
 Graham Ryding (born 1975), Canadian squashplayer
 Wayne Ryding, Australian-born British Paralympic swimmer
 Yvonne Ryding (born 1962), Swedish beauty queen, Miss Universe 1984